In Spain there is an extensive  system of  railways. The majority of these railways was historically operated by FEVE, (Ferrocarriles Españoles de Vía Estrecha, Spanish narrow-gauge railways). Created in 1965 FEVE started absorbing numerous private-owned narrow-gauge railways.  From 1978 onwards, with the introduction of regionalisation devolution under the new Spanish constitution, FEVE began transferring responsibility for a number of its operations to the new regional governments. On 31 December 2012 the company disappeared due to the merger of the narrow-gauge network FEVE and the broad-gauge network RENFE.

In 2023 transport officials  in RENFE in Spain resigned when it was found that narrow-gauge passenger rolling-stock ordered in 2020 for the northern regions of Asturias and Cantabria would be too wide for the tunnels and were to be redesigned with delays of a year or two in delivery.

Northern Spain

In the north of the country, operated by RENFE and EuskoTren (Eusko Trenbideak, Basque Railways). At the centre of this system is a metre-gauge line which runs for  along the entire length of Spain's north coast.

EuskoTren is the Basque regional government rail company. This company also owns several bus lines.

The Euskotren Tranbia in Bilbao is a tramway line.

The Renfe metre-gauge network in Northern Spain and EuskoTren form the longest narrow-gauge network in Europe.

Andalusia
 FC Granada a Sierra Nevada;  gauge, 1925-1974

Castile–La Mancha
 FC Valdepenas a Puertollano;  gauge, 1924-1963

Catalonia
Barcelona
 FGC (Catalan regional government railways), Metro del Baix Llobregat, Llobregat–Anoia line
 Funicular de Vallvidrera
 Funicular del Tibidabo
Gelida
 Funicular de Gelida
Girona
 FC de Flassa a Palamos, Gerona y Banolas;  gauge, 1892-1969
 FC de San Feliu de Guixois a Gerona;  gauge, 1887-1956
Montserrat
 Funicular de Sant Joan
 Funicular de la Santa Cova at Montserrat
 Cremallera de Montserrat, a rack railway.
Northern Catalonia
 Cremallera de Núria, a rack railway.
 Ferrocarril Turístic de l'Alt Llobregat, a  gauge tourist line.

Valencian community
 FGV (Valencian regional government railways) around the city of Valencia, as well as along the Costa Blanca from Alicante to Denia
Castellón
 FC de Onda al Grao de Castellon y Villareal-Puerto de Burriana;  gauge, 1888-1963

Madrid

 Ferrocaril Électrico del Guadarrama near Madrid, in the Sierra del Guadarrama, runs a metre gauge electric line through a short but extremely sinuous track from Cercedilla to Los Cotos. This is the only narrow gauge railway operated by RENFE rather than FEVE.

Majorca
 SFM (Serveis Ferroviaris de Mallorca); 
 FS (Ferrocarril de Sóller) operates a  gauge electrified railway and connecting tramway, the Tranvía de Sóller.
 Palma Metro;

Murcia
 Renfe operates the  Cartagena-Los Nietos Line;  gauge

See also

History of rail transport in Spain
Rail transport in Spain

References

External links